This is a list of members of the 19th Legislative Assembly of Queensland from 1912 to 1915, as elected at the 1912 state election held on 27 April 1912.

Apart from the 1904–1907 term, when Labor had held two seats short of a majority, the parliament had been dominated by non-Labor forces since the separation of Queensland from New South Wales in 1860 — this was the last such parliament until 1957, apart from the 1929–1932 term led by the Moore Ministry.

Notes 
  At the 1912 election in Maryborough, Edward Corser, the sitting Liberal member, won against Labor candidate William Mitchell by 10 votes. The election was declared void and went to a by-election on 12 October 1912, at which Corser won again, but by just 2 votes.
  At the 1912 election in Port Curtis, Edward Breslin, the sitting Labor member, won against Liberal candidate John Kessell by 2 votes. The election was declared void on 9 October 1912 and went to a by-election on 26 October, at which Kessell won by 96 votes.
  On 28 March 1913, Arnold Wienholt, the Liberal member for Fassifern, resigned to contest Wide Bay at the 1913 federal election. Liberal candidate Ernest Bell won the resulting by-election on 24 April 1913.
  On 27 January 1914, George Fox, the Liberal member for Normanby, died. Liberal candidate Edward Archer won the resulting by-election on 5 March 1914.

References

 Waterson, Duncan Bruce: Biographical Register of the Queensland Parliament 1860-1929 (second edition), Sydney 2001.
1912 Queensland state election
Denham Ministry (Liberal) (1911–1915)

Members of Queensland parliaments by term
20th-century Australian politicians